WBH may refer to:

 West German Audio Book Library for the Blind
 Williamstown Beach railway station, Victoria, Australia
 Wells Bring Hope - see List of water-related charities
 A model of the Chevrolet Avalanche car
 West Bird's Head languages of New Guinea
 Wanda language of Tanzania (ISO 639-3	code: wbh)